Vaibhav Govekar is an Indian cricketer. He made his Twenty20 debut for Goa in the 2018–19 Syed Mushtaq Ali Trophy on 2 March 2019. He made his List A debut on 26 September 2019, for Goa in the 2019–20 Vijay Hazare Trophy. He made his first-class debut on 3 January 2020, for Goa in the 2019–20 Ranji Trophy.

References

External links
 

Year of birth missing (living people)
Living people
Indian cricketers
Goa cricketers
Place of birth missing (living people)